The 1984–85 NCAA Division I men's ice hockey season began in October 1984 and concluded with the 1985 NCAA Division I Men's Ice Hockey Tournament's championship game on March 30, 1985 at the Joe Louis Arena in Detroit, Michigan. This was the 38th season in which an NCAA ice hockey championship was held and is the 91st year overall where an NCAA school fielded a team.

Seven teams from ECAC Hockey left after the previous year to form a new conference, Hockey East.

Hockey East and the WCHA formed an agreement where games played between their respective conferences would count towards the standings in each conference. This arrangement would continue for five year, ending after the 1988–89 season.

Regular season

Season tournaments

Standings

1985 NCAA Tournament

Note: * denotes overtime period(s)

Player stats

Scoring leaders
The following players led the league in points at the conclusion of the season.

  
GP = Games played; G = Goals; A = Assists; Pts = Points; PIM = Penalty minutes

Leading goaltenders
The following goaltenders led the league in goals against average at the end of the regular season while playing at least 33% of their team's total minutes.

GP = Games played; Min = Minutes played; W = Wins; L = Losses; OT = Overtime/shootout losses; GA = Goals against; SO = Shutouts; SV% = Save percentage; GAA = Goals against average

Awards

NCAA

CCHA

ECAC

Hockey East

WCHA

See also
 1984–85 NCAA Division III men's ice hockey season

References

External links
College Hockey Historical Archives
1984–85 NCAA Standings

 
NCAA